The 2018 Mid-American Conference women's soccer tournament was the postseason women's soccer tournament for the Mid-American Conference held from October 28 through November 4, 2018. The quarterfinals were held at campus sites. The semifinals and finals took place at Mickey Cochrane Stadium in Bowling Green, Ohio, home of the Bowling Green Falcons, the highest remaining seed in the tournament following the quarterfinal matches. The eight-team single-elimination tournament consisted of three rounds based on seeding from regular season conference play. The Toledo Rockets were the defending champions, but they did not qualify for the tournament after finishing 10th in the regular season. The Bowling Green Falcons won the tournament with a 5–4 penalty shootout win over the Ball State Cardinals in the final. The title was the third for the Bowling Green women's soccer program and the first for head coach Matt Fannon.

Bracket

Source:

Schedule

Quarterfinals

Semifinals

Final

Statistics

Goalscorers 

2 Goals
 Nikki Cox - Bowling Green
 Paula Guerrero - Ball State

1 Goal
 Mandy Arnzen - Ohio
 Gurgeena Jandu - Buffalo
 Vital Kats - Kent State
 Maureen Kennedy - Bowling Green
 Sydney Leckie - Ohio
 Kristin Nason - Eastern Michigan
 Morgan Otteson - Western Michigan
 Jennifer Reyes - Bowling Green
 Emily Simmons - Ball State

Own Goals
 Western Michigan vs. Ball State

All-Tournament team

Source:

See also 
 2018 MAC Men's Soccer Tournament

References 

Mid-American Conference Women's Soccer Tournament
2018 Mid-American Conference women's soccer season